Gregory Victor Loewen (born 1966) is a Canadian social philosopher in the traditions of hermeneutics and phenomenology. The author of over thirty scholarly non-fiction books as well as over twenty works of fiction, he is age-relative one of a number of modern period academic writers to have produced a significant body of work early in their careers, along with Herder, de Bono, Spir, Joad, Aguilera, and Schelling.

Biography 
Born in Victoria, January 31, 1966, Loewen was educated at the University of Victoria with a BA and MA in anthropology and at the University of British Columbia, receiving the PhD in anthropology in 1997. He held two tenure stream positions in the United States before taking up his academic position in Saskatoon, Canada, in 2005, where he was chair of the sociology department for five years and from which he retired in 2018. He lives on Vancouver Island and is married to the sociologist Jennifer Lynn Heller.

Ideas 
Loewen's work fits squarely in the overlapping traditions of hermeneutics and phenomenology, where it is assumed that all human perception is subject to variable comprehension and the coming to a shared understanding of texts, worldviews, and even natural objects and forces is an exercise in the arts and uses of language.

In Hermeneutic Pedagogy, Loewen "aims to expound the educational process in the hermeneutical tradition, but is also an essay on the educational model the author calls the hermeneutical circle of experiential pedagogy. Loewen elaborates a conception of learning which considers the dynamic relations between the conservative, the technical and the moral dimensions of education."  The book defines the relationships amongst hexis, or custom, praxis, or applied theory, and phronesis, the Aristotelian understanding of practical wisdom, to which the critical interpretive process of learning ultimately aims. "Custom is only a first step in the dialectical process of learning. Not only do we forget and alter what we are taught, but also come to contest. Customs are reinterpreted, theory adjusted to suit reality, the social reality of tradition is reshaped, and the episteme of the serious business of constructing knowledge takes on its new historical task." The second step of a learning process is praxis applied theory. Its aim is to expand knowledge, to use it for progressive purposes. The institutions, says Loewen, are now the medium through which a paradigm comes into being. While 'repetition' is the key word for hexis and 'extension' for praxis, the process of learning fulfils itself in phronesis or practical knowledge. "While custom presents a ready-made reality for our consumption and oblation, and theory presents to us the revolution of consciousness that overturns that world, practical wisdom shines upon the light of worldliness, the way in which the world worlds itself." Through phronesis the hermeneutical circle of experiential pedagogy, as Loewen calls it, closes and accomplishes itself. It enlightens the other two constitutive dimensions, it puts them into question and reveals the abilities they do not capture, but which are central to the human being as a learning being. Phronesis names the radical learning experience that one individual has, experience which cannot be taught." Loewen's (2003, 2004, 2012) studies of educational processes expose the tacit expectations and latent functions of institutions and discourses, and owe much to the pioneering works of Bourdieu and Passeron. But Loewen balances critique that is found within the dialectic with an attempt at reconstructing learning through the dialogue of hermeneutics.

Loewen's work on religion runs from general discussions of the relationships between science and religion, reason and faith (2008 and 2012), to scholarly investigations into the hermeneutic dimensions of religious experience, and studies of William James, Heidegger, Weber and Durkheim (2009). His popular books have a distinctively Durkheimian tone. In What is God? Loewen asserts that it is the combination of human aspiration to be more than our mortality allows, along with the anxiety regarding that very same mortality that provides the subjective inclination for the religious life. The cultural necessity for religion is grounded in the need for human community. In On the Afterlife, he presents a new comparative and historical model of beliefs in the purposes and meanings of life after death which calls into operation his anthropological training. He suggests that all known societies are categorized by one of five patterns, either thinking that the soul returns unevaluated to the world, it returns evaluated, it is evaluated and does not return, or it remains unevaluated and does not return. The conception of nothingness is a peculiarly modern understanding, but Loewen argues that it does not hamper our ethical efforts while we are alive to imagine that mortality comes to an abrupt and final halt. He concludes that each of these five models are aiming to remind us of the same human condition, one that he sees historically as presenting each of us both a gift and a task. His notion of 'phenomemnemonics', the study of objects by which we use to remember other experiences, also has particular relevance to the links between biography and religious traditions.

Becoming a Modest Society distinguishes the uncritical and reflective meanings held within a number of oft confused pairs of concepts, including morals and ethics, prudence and prudishness, bravery and bravado, pessimism and skepticism and modesty and humility, amongst others. Loewen clearly favors conceptions of society that are critical, interpretive, and bring to the fore our shared human ability to not merely be curious about the social world, but to hone the ability to 'unexpect the expected' from ourselves and those around us, that is, to be suspicious of the routine relations that we observe in society as a whole, as well as between or amongst individuals. Loewen has developed several other phenomenological concepts that are then used in the analysis of political and social relations, including 'antigonality', which is encapsulated as "the politics of doubt, the doubting of politics".

Bibliography 
This lists only non-fiction and scholarly monographs by Loewen. There are also numerous journal articles, a novella, an anthology of short fiction and an edited volume and others. An eleven volume YA adventure saga began to appear in 2018 and publication was concluded in 2022.
 The Misplaced Love of the Dead: and other essays in transformative ethics (2023) 
 A Pedagogy for the Suppressed (2023) 
 The Scandal of Thought: impolitical commentaries (2023) 
 Reimagining the Future: a phenomenology of cross-temporal presence, volume three (2022) 
 Represencing the Present: a phenomenology of cross-temporal presence, volume two (2022) 
 Reintroducing the Past: a phenomenology of cross-temporal presence, volume one (2022) 
 On Time: appointments, schedules, calendars, deadlines (2021) 
 Words are also Deeds: essays in public ethics and private aesthetics (2021) 
 On Being Ignored: and other necessities of the examined life (2020) 
 The Penumbra of Personhood: 'Anti-Humanism' Reconsidered (2020) 
 Blind Spots: The Altered Perceptions of Anxiety, Remorse and Nostalgia (2019) 
 Sacred Science: Ritual and Miracle in Modern Medicine (2017), 
 The Bungle Book: Some Errors by Which We Live (2016), 
 Place Meant: Hermeneutic Landscapes of the Spatial Self (2015), 
 The Big Secrets: ten things every young person needs to know about and why (2014), 
 We Other Nazis - how you and I are still like them  (2013), 
 The Reason of Unreason (and the Risus Sardonicus of Rationality (2013),  
 Hermeneutic Pedagogy: teaching and learning as dialogue and interpretation (2012), 
 Our Memory of Things: a phenomemnemonics of the object (2012), .
 On the Use of Art in the Construction of Personal Identity: toward a phenomenology of aesthetic self-consciousness (2012), 
 On the Afterlife: you will get there from here (2012), 
 Aesthetic Subjectivity: glimpsing the shared soul (2011), 
 The Sociological Vision: an interpretive introduction (2011), 
 Fetish, Cult and Disenchantment: sociological studies of the projected self (2011), 
 Three Apodeictic Dialogues: Examples of Conceptual Mirrors in Religion, Psychology and Social Organization (2010), 
 Becoming A Modest Society: On Distinguishing Ourselves (2009), 
 Social Science Interpretations of Religion: Comparing the Hermeneutic  Methodologies of James, Weber, Heidegger and Durkheim (2009)
 What is God? Musings on Human Anxieties and Aspirations (2008), 
 How can we Explain the Persistence of Irrational Beliefs? Studies in social anthropology (2006), 
 Adventures in the Aporetic: Anthropological Alterities (2005), 
 A Socio-Ethnography of the Academic Professionalization of Anthropologists (2004), 
 Hermeneutical Apprenticeships: Essays. Epigrams, Verse (2003),

References

External links 

 Gregory Loewen at University of Saskatchewan
  home site: gvloewen.ca

Hermeneutists
20th-century Canadian philosophers
21st-century Canadian philosophers
Phenomenologists
Social philosophers
Academic staff of the University of Saskatchewan
1966 births
Living people